Ignatius John O'Brien, 1st Baron Shandon,  (31 July 1857 – 10 September 1930), known as Sir Ignatius O'Brien, Bt, between 1916 and 1918, was an Irish lawyer and politician. He served as Lord Chancellor of Ireland between 1913 and 1918.

Early life
O'Brien was born in Cork, the youngest son of Mark Joseph O'Brien and Jane, daughter of William Dunne. He was educated at the Vincentian School there and, at the age of 16, entered the Catholic University of Ireland in Dublin but left after two years due to family circumstances. O'Brien thought the university system was too biased towards the classics and took a lifelong interest in science and technical education.
He worked as a junior reporter for the Saunders Newsletter, a Dublin Conservative daily newspaper and then for Freeman's Journal while studying part-time for the Bar. Called to the Irish Bar, King's Inn, in 1881, O'Brien was slow to build a practice and continued to support himself through freelance journalism, within three years he had established a small practice on the Munster circuit.

Keller Case
In 1887 O'Brien became involved in the case of Canon Keller which was to establish his legal career and reputation. Keller, who was the parish priest of Youghal, was called to give evidence in the Bankruptcy Court regarding the financial circumstances of some of his Parishioners involved in the "Plan of Campaign" rent strikes. Keller refused to answer questions on the grounds that he had obtained this information in his capacity as a confessor, and that breaching the seal of the confessional contravened Catholic Canon law. As a result, Keller was imprisoned for contempt of court. O'Brien argued in support of a writ of habeas corpus. Although unsuccessful in the Court of Queen's Bench, his argument prevailed in the Irish Court of Appeal

Later legal and political career
Propelled by the reputation he won in the Keller case, O'Brien gave up circuit court work and concentrated on Chancery and Bankruptcy matters and became a leading authority on bankruptcy law. He was called to the Inner Bar as an Irish Queen's Counsel in 1899, became a bencher of King's Inns in 1907 and was appointed Serjeant at Law (then the highest rank for an Irish barrister) in 1910. A supporter of Home Rule and the Liberal Party, O'Brien campaigned on behalf of Liberal candidates but did not stand for parliament himself. In 1911 he was appointed Solicitor General for Ireland in H. H. Asquith's Liberal administration and advanced to Attorney General in 1912, becoming a member of the Irish Privy Council in the same year. In this capacity, he prosecuted suffragettes who tried to set fire to the Dublin Theatre Royal, although he himself was personally in favour of women's suffrage.

In 1913 the office of Lord Chancellor of Ireland fell vacant and O'Brien, as Attorney General, was by a longstanding tradition entitled to claim the position. As a judge he was not highly regarded; his pompous manner in Court led to unkind comparison with a bullfrog; more seriously there were frequent complaints that his constant interruptions from the Bench made it almost impossible for counsel to present their cases properly.

Lord Chancellor
O'Brien's tenure as Lord Chancellor was only secure as long as the Liberal Party remained in government at Westminster. In 1915 the Asquith Government was forced to resign and enter into a wartime coalition with the Conservative Party. British Conservatives, supported behind the scenes by T.M. Healy sought to replace O'Brien with his Unionist rival James Campbell. Out of consideration for Irish Nationalist opinion, O'Brien remained in office and was created a Baronet, of Ardtona in the Parish of Dundrum in the County of Dublin, in 1916. During the 1916 Easter Rising O'Brien drew up the formal proclamation of martial law issued by the Lord Lieutenant, Lord Wimborne. By 1918 however, Conservative and Unionist opinion was ascendant and O'Brien was replaced as Lord Chancellor by Campbell. He received a peerage as a consolation and became Baron Shandon, of the City of Cork.

Later life
A constitutional nationalist who supported home rule without breaking the imperial link with Great Britain, O'Brien was opposed to the aims and methods of Sinn Féin. After an IRA raid on his home, he left Ireland for good, settling in the Isle of Wight. Although sceptical of the House of Lords , O'Brien found the peers agreeable and became reconciled with its largely hereditary nature. His participation in the House of Lords was usually limited to matters affecting Ireland or issues on which he had legal expertise. He took an active part in the debates and negotiations surrounding the Government of Ireland Act 1920.

In 1926-27 he wrote a memoir, which was published by Four Courts Press, Dublin in 2021,

Baron Shandon had no issue but wished to pass on his titles to his nephew but, in order to achieve this, he would need a Letter of Remainder, which could be acquired by an application to the Crown Office at the House of Parliament, Westminster. On reflection, in 1929, he realised that this was not an option open to him as Ireland was no longer under the jurisdiction of the United Kingdom and that both the Baronetcy and Barony were outside that jurisdiction. Added to this fact, the 1922 Act, section 5, precluded them from granting such a Letter of Remainder.

The Baron believed that he could pass his titles by Way of Remainder and this he so did through his Last Will and Testament. The Letters Patent to both Baronetcy and Barony, along with his Lord Chancellor's Purse, the silver casket containing the Freedom of the City of Cork, various other historical letters patent and other artefacts were passed to his nephew, Gerald Horan KC, first Master of the Rolls and then Master of the High Court in Ireland. Previously Gerald Horan had been Permanent Secretary to the Lord Chancellors of Ireland, Clerk of the Crown and Hanaper, Keeper of the Seal and Captain of the Guard of the Purse

Baron Shandon died in London on 10 Sept. 1930, Probate Granted London on 23 Oct.1930

Gerald Horan KC held the position of Master of the High Court in Ireland up until a few days before his death from ill health at his residence, St. Peter's, Ailesbury Road, Dublin 4. He was a barrister who became, Clerk of the Crown and Hanaper, Permanent Secretary to the Lord Chancellors of Ireland and, as such, was very much involved in the transition stages of Ireland becoming a separate identity from the UK.

He was actively involved in the reduction of the Unionist demand for ten counties down to six counties for the formation of Northern Ireland. This was only achieved by the Unionists grouping together every single person of any belief, other than Catholic, or non-belief, to create a majority. A throwaway remark at that time said ‘it needed their cattle, sheep, cats and dogs included to achieve the required majority’.

After the establishment of Independence, Gerald Horan KC relinquished his positions under the crown to become Master of the Rolls in Ireland and subsequently Master of the High Court in Ireland. An interesting petition was brought before him by his previous ‘Masters’ and that was for the return of the Seal Making Equipment to the United Kingdom but, at the same time, there was a petition from those representing the IRA to have possession of the Seal Making Equipment in order that they might publicly destroy same.

The decision that Gerald Horan KC came to was that the Seal Making Equipment should be entrusted to the safe keeping of the National Museum where both parties could ponder the same, and that is where it is up to this date.

During his time as Master of the High Court in Ireland, Gerald Horan KC wrote a book entitled Circuit Court Practice (Saorstát Éireann) containing statutes, rules, orders and forms relating to the general procedure and jurisdiction of the Circuit Court. This was written to provide a clear understanding of Circuit Court procedure and became required reading for all involved - in his Last Will and Testament, dated 27 Jan 1938, he left all 'his property of every nature and kind whatsoever and wheresoever’ to his wife Kathleen. Gerald Horan KC died in Dublin on 10 May 1949, Probate Granted Dublin on 3 Sept.1949 (CS/HC/PO/4/102/4954)

Kathleen Horan, wife of Gerald Horan KC, of 37 Trees Road, Mount Merrion, Dublin - in her Last Will & Testament dated 21 Aug. 1963 passed The Letters Patent to both Baronetcy and Barony, along with his Lord Chancellor's Purse, the silver casket containing the Freedom of the City of Cork, various other historical letters patent and other artefacts to Desmond Gerald Horan LLb. Sol., only son of Gerald Horan KC.

Kathleen Horan died in Dublin on 28 Dec.1963, Probate Granted Dublin on 11 June 1964

Desmond Gerald Horan, a barrister and solicitor, worked in Dublin before taking up a position in the Province of Ontario, Canada, as Mining Court Registrar, later becoming Mining Commissioner for Ontario, Canada. During that time he compiled and edited a definitive book on the matter entitled ‘Mining Court and Mining Commissioners Cases' Vol:3

In his Last Will & Testament dated 14 May 1975 - he passed The Letters Patent to both Baronetcy and Barony, along with the Lord Chancellor’s Purse, the silver casket containing the Freedom of the City of Cork, various other historical letters patent and other artefacts including Baron Shandon’s Memoirs to his son Niall Patrick Horan

Desmond Gerald Horan died in Dublin on 4 June 1975, Probate Granted Ontario, Canada 29 Sept. 1975 (5853/75)

Niall Patrick Horan, after many years of deliberation, petitioned the Chief Herald of Ireland for a Grant of Arms to reflect the historic nature of the family history, the relationship to and the decision of Baron Shandon. A Grant of Arms was made with a crest described as ‘Out of a coronet of four pearls all proper a demi lion rampant or’ on 3 July 1998, Vol. Y, folio 31

Marriage
Lord Shandon married Anne, daughter of John Talbot Scallan, a prominent Dublin solicitor, in 1886. She died in February 1929. Their marriage was childless so when O'Brien died in London the following year, aged 73, his peerage became extinct.

Arms

References

External links
 
 
 

1857 births
1930 deaths
Shandon, Ignatius John O'Brien, 1st Baron
Members of the Privy Council of Ireland
Liberal Party (UK) hereditary peers
Lord chancellors of Ireland
Politicians from County Cork
Solicitors-General for Ireland
Attorneys-General for Ireland
Serjeants-at-law (Ireland)
Alumni of King's Inns
Barons created by George V